The CBV Real Estate Index is the first index on the Vietnamese real estate market.  It is built based on the newest methodology of S&P for that market.

Types of indices 
CBV real estate index can be categorized into following 7 smaller indexes:

  CBV Vietnam Real Estate Composite Index
  CBV Hanoi Real Estate Index
  CBV Ho Chi Minh City Real Estate Index
  CBV Vietnam Office Index
  CBV Vietnam Apartment Index
  CBV Vietnam Retail Index
  CBV Vietnam Warehouse Index

Real estate indices